Orlah (Hebrew: ערלה, lit. "Blockage of Trees") is the tenth tractate of Seder Zeraim ("Order of Seeds") of the Mishnah and of the Talmud. It discusses the laws pertaining to any fruit bearing tree, whose fruits cannot be eaten during the first three years the tree produces fruit. This law applies everywhere and for all time in Jewish communities and for any fruit bearing tree owned by a Jew. Then it discusses the laws of "Neta Revai", by which produce of the fourth year is to be treated like "Maaser Sheni".

External links
Full text of the Mishnah for tractate Orlah on Sefaria (Hebrew and English)
Rules of Orlah in Maimonides’ Code of Jewish Law